"At Last" is a 1941 song by Harry Warren and Mack Gordon first popularized by Glenn Miller and later made a standard by Etta James.

At Last may also refer to:

Film and TV
 At Last (film), a 2005 film starring Brooke Adams
 At Last the 1948 Show, a British satirical television show
 "At Last", alternate title of the Phineas and Ferb episode "Phineas and Ferb Get Busted!"

Music
 At Last (band), a band that was a finalist in the first season of America's Got Talent

Albums
 At Last!, an album by Etta James
 At Last (Cyndi Lauper album)
 At Last (Etta Jones album)
 At Last (Lynda Carter album)
 At Last...The Duets Album, an album by Kenny G
 At Last, an album by Gladys Knight
At Last (Alex Faith album)

See also
 At Least, At Last, a rarities box set by The Posies
 Free at Last (disambiguation)
 Last (disambiguation)